Philip of Flersheim (1481 in Kaiserslautern – 14 August 1552 in Zabern (now called Saverne) in the Alsace) was a German nobleman.  He was Prince-bishop of Speyer as Philip II from 1529 until his death.  From 1546 until his death, he was also Prince-provost of Weißenburg Abbey.

16th-century German Roman Catholic bishops
1481 births
1552 deaths
Roman Catholic bishops of Speyer